Ombaka National Stadium is a multi-use stadium in Benguela, Angola.  Completed in 2010, it is used mostly for football matches and has hosted some events for the 2010 African Cup of Nations. The stadium has a capacity of 35,000 people.

References

External links
Venue information 
Stadium information
Photographs of the Stadium

Buildings and structures in Benguela
Football venues in Angola
2010 Africa Cup of Nations